Syed Sibtey Razi (7 March 1939 – 20 August 2022) was an Indian politician belonging to the Indian National Congress who served as the governor of Assam and Jharkhand, in addition to also serving as the Deputy Home minister of India.

Early life 

Razi was born on 7 March 1939 to Syed Wirasat Husain and Razia Begum in Jais ,Rae Bareli (now in Amethi district) a town of Awadh region in Uttar pradesh. He went to school at the Husainabad Higher Secondary school, and then to the Shi'a College where he was President of the Student Union. During the same period he maintained accounts for two restaurants Kays Kozy Corner and Hotel Krishna, where he worked for Prem Narain Tandon, a local businessman. He earned his BComm from Lucknow University where he was elected President of the Commerce Association. Syed Sibtay Razi formed a socio-cultural association called 'Anjuman Adab-e-Atfal in Lucknow. He was Life President of this Association. It organizes children's tour, local & within the state as well. It helps lower income group's wards with a library at its office. It awards the children various prizes, organizes competitions, and the best child is awarded the title of 'Anjuman Blue' annually.

Career 

Razi joined the Uttar Pradesh Youth Indian National Congress (INC) in 1969 and became the head of the Youth Congress in 1971 and continued to lead the Congress until 1973. He was a member of the Rajya Sabha from 1980 to 1985 and General Secretary of the U.P. Congress committee from 1980 to 1984. He served a second term in the Rajya Sabha from 1988 to 1992 and served a third term from 1992 to 1998.

Razi Razi caused controversy in March 2005 when the NDA, with its 36 MLAs along with letters of support from five independents,
thus with a total support of 41 in an 81-member assembly (the strength of Jharkhand State Assembly is 82 which includes one nominated member) staked claim to form the government after elections in the state. However, Governor Razi refused to accede and instead, invited Shibu Soren of the Jharkhand Mukti Morcha to form the government. This started a chain of dramatic political events as supporters of the new Chief Minister tried to intimidate the independents supporting the NDA, as a result of which the five were secreted away to New Delhi by the BJP and paraded before the media and the President.
Subsequently, an NDA government led by Arjun Munda was sworn into office on 13 March 2005 and the government went on to prove its majority on the floor of the House.

Death 
Razi died of heart disease on 20 August 2022, at the age of 83. His final resting place is imambara Ghufran Ma'ab in old Lucknow.

References

External links 
 

1939 births
2022 deaths
People from Uttar Pradesh
Indian National Congress politicians
Members of the Rajya Sabha
Governors of Jharkhand
Governors of Assam
University of Lucknow alumni
People from Raebareli
Indian National Congress politicians from Uttar Pradesh